Ndumba Makeche is a Zambian Australian professional football player who plays as a forward.

Early life
Makeche was born in Lusaka before emigrating to Australia. He became an Australian citizen in August 2012.

Club career
Shortly after arriving in Western Australia, Makeche joined State league side Stirling Lions where he played three seasons. A 2011 move to Inglewood United brought Makeche the regular first team football he sought, while his knack for finding the back of the net lead to a youth team deal with Perth Glory.

Perth Glory
In 2011, he signed a youth contract with A-League club Perth Glory. He made his professional debut in the 2011–12 A-League season on 18 March 2012 in a round 26 clash against Gold Coast United at the Skilled Park.

On 1 May 2012, it was announced he had signed a two-year senior contract with Perth Glory.

FELDA United
On 28 February 2014, after reaching a mutual agreement with Perth Glory, Makeche signed with Malaysian club FELDA United.

Sarawak
Makeche was revealed as the newest signing by Malaysian league side CF Sarawak in mid-December 2015 for 2016 Malaysia Super League.

South Melbourne
Makeche returned to Australia, signing for the remainder for the 2018 NPL season for South Melbourne. On 10 June 2018, he made his debut as a 71st minute substitute against Dandenong Thunder, and scored the final goal in a 4–0 win, after being on the pitch for just 4 minutes.

References

1992 births
Living people
Sportspeople from Lusaka
Australian soccer players
Australian people of Zambian descent
Zambian footballers
Perth Glory FC players
Felda United F.C. players
Sarawak FA players
Perlis FA players
A-League Men players
Association football forwards
Expatriate footballers in Malaysia
Australian expatriate sportspeople in Malaysia
Zambian expatriates in Malaysia
National Premier Leagues players
South Melbourne FC players
Altona Magic SC players
Bayswater City SC players
Stirling Macedonia FC players
Inglewood United FC players